Westbeach Recorders was a recording studio in Hollywood, California famous for recording punk rock groups, such as Bad Religion, Avenged Sevenfold, NOFX, Rancid, The Offspring and Pennywise.

History

It was established in 1985 by Bad Religion guitarist Brett Gurewitz in Culver City, California after he attended recording school, and re-located to Hollywood, California in February 1987. They moved for the final time in 1988 to the former location of Seymour Heller's Producer's Workshop studios on Hollywood Boulevard. In a back room closet at this location, Epitaph Records had its first office.

Donnell Cameron became a partner in 1988 and was the studio owner/engineer until May 12, 2010, when Westbeach Recorders went out of business.

References

Bad Religion
Recording studios in California